Gary Wolf is an American writer, contributing editor at Wired magazine, and co-founder of the Quantified Self. Wolf earned a BA from Reed College in Portland, Oregon and an MA from the University of California, Berkeley.

Wolf published for The New York Times Magazine, and Wired. Wolf wrote several long articles for Wired magazine. Among them he wrote an article about Ted Nelson and Project Xanadu, Steve Wozniak, Ray Kurzweil, a long interview with Steve Jobs, and Amazon. He coined the pejorative New Atheism in 2006 to describe the positions promoted by some atheists of the 21st century, among them Richard Dawkins, Sam Harris, Christopher Hitchens and Daniel Dennett.

In 2007, with Kevin Kelly, Wolf co-founded the Quantified Self, a collaboration of users and tool makers who share an interest in self-knowledge through self-tracking. In 2010, he spoke about the movement at TED.

Books
Aether Madness: An Offbeat Guide to the Online World, with Michael Stein (Peachpit Press, 1995)
Dumb Money: Adventures of a Day Trader, with Joey Anuff (Random House, 2000)
Wired – A Romance (Random House, 2003)

References

External links
ANTEPHASE Wolf's personal site.
Telepolis interview with Gary Wolf

Living people
Writers from the San Francisco Bay Area
American male journalists
Wired (magazine) people
1961 births